are Japanese amulets commonly sold at Shinto shrines and Buddhist temples, dedicated to particular Shinto  as well as Buddhist figures, and are said to provide various forms of luck and protection.

Origin and usage
Originally made from paper or wood, modern amulets are small items usually kept inside a brocade bag and may contain a prayer, religious inscription of invocation.  are available at both Shinto shrines and Buddhist temples with few exceptions and are available for sale, regardless of one's religious affiliation.

While  are intended for temple tourists' personal use, they are mainly viewed as a donation to the temple or shrine the person is visiting. Visitors often give  as a gift to another person as a physical form of well-wishing.

Design and function

 are usually covered with brocaded silk and enclose paper or pieces of wood with prayers written on them, which are supposed to bring good luck to the bearer on particular occasions, tasks, or ordeals.  are also used to ward off bad luck and are often spotted on bags, hung on cellphone straps, in cars, etc.

 have changed over the years from being made mostly of paper and/or wood to being made out of a wide variety of materials (i.e. bumper decals, bicycle reflectors, credit cards, etc.). Usually this happens when more popular shrines and temples cannot keep up with the high demand for certain charms. However, priests have been known to complain about the quality and authenticity of the products made by factories.

According to Yanagita Kunio (1969):

Usage

 may provide general blessings and protection, or may have a specific focus such as:

 : traffic safety-protection for drivers and travelers of all sorts
 : avoidance of evil
 : open luck, better fortune
 : education and passing examinations—for students and scholars
 : prosperity in business—success in business and matters of money
 : acquisition of a mate and marriage—available for singles and couples to ensure love and marriage
 : protection for pregnant women for a healthy pregnancy and easy delivery
 : safety (well-being) of one's family, peace and prosperity in the household

Customarily,  are not opened in order to avoid losing their protective benefits. They are instead carried on one's person, or tied to something like a backpack or a purse. It is not necessary, but amulets are customarily replaced once a year to ward off bad luck from the previous year. Old amulets are usually returned to the same shrine or temple they were purchased at so they can be disposed of properly. Amulets are commonly returned on or slightly after New Year's. This way the shrine/temple visitor has a fresh start for the New Year with a new .

Old  traditionally should not be disposed of, but burned, as a sign of respect to the deity that assisted the person throughout the year.

If a shrine or temple visitor cannot find an  that meets their need, they can request for a priest to have one made.

Modern commercial uses
There are modern commercial versions of  that are typically not spiritual in nature and are not issued by a shrine or temple. It has become popular for stores in Japan to feature generic  with popular characters such as Mickey Mouse, Hello Kitty, Snoopy, Kewpie, etc.

See also

References

Further reading

External links

 Omamori.com

Amulets
Talismans
Shinto
Buddhist religious objects
Religious objects
Shinto religious objects
Superstitions of Japan
Eastern esotericism
Japanese words and phrases